Nikolas Sideris (born 1977 in Athens, Greece), has been studying music since the age of 5, and holds a PhD in composition from Royal Holloway, University of London. He received his Masters in Composition from the same university in 2005 with distinction and he also has a diploma in Piano with honors, and degrees in Harmony, Counterpoint and Fugue. His studies in the UK were funded by the National Scholarship Foundation of Greece (IKY).
Nikolas, as a pianist has performed in concerts all over Greece, the USA and Syria.

He is also active as composer and sound designer in the computer games industry
He scored the game Privates by Size Five Games, that won a BAFTA for best Educational - Secondary Game. And he wrote the music for Resonance (video game). He co-owns North by Sound, an Audio Production company based in Norway and Greece and is the founder of Editions Musica Ferrum, a music publishing house.

Works and awards

His works have been performed in the UK, USA, Germany and Greece and range from small works for solo instruments, to large works for string orchestras.

His work Piano Stories for piano, 4 hands won the 1st prize in the Second International Composition Competition "Artistes en Herbes" in Luxembourg in 2013. The score includes drawings, and feature common in Sideris' work. In Fairyland in Treble he puts some of his music for games in an educative score of 2 piano's. The book not only contains a colourful drawing on the front page, but also includes accompanying fairytales. 
His work for string orchestra Exeliksis won the first prize in the Royal Holloway Composition Competition in 2005 and was performed live the next year in Egham, UK. He has received commissions by orchestras and soloists from around the world and his work The City Under Different Eyes for Solo Piano and Audio Manipulation was featured in an adaptive audio playback software system.

References

1977 births
21st-century classical composers
Greek classical composers
Living people
Male classical composers
21st-century male musicians
Musicians from Athens